Octopus Islands Marine Provincial Park is a provincial park in British Columbia, Canada. It is located between Quadra Island and Maurelle Island in Okisollo Channel.

External links

 Octopus Islands Provincial Park infopage

Provincial Parks of the Discovery Islands
Provincial parks of British Columbia
1974 establishments in British Columbia
Protected areas established in 1974
Marine parks of Canada